"Never Really Loved Me" is a song by Norwegian record producer and DJ Kygo and Australian singer and songwriter Dean Lewis. It was released on 1 July 2022.

Reception
Pradeep Bharathi from Cultr said "The track opens up with piano chord progression and is followed with Dean's soothing and soulful vocals that brings the track altogether. The drop buildup has Kygo's signature style vocal chops and slowly evolves to powerful chill drop. Fans of both artists will be jamming to this single and will definitely love it."

Samuel from EDM Tunes called the song "a sensational classic" saying "The track is filled with memorable lyrics and Kygo style piano rifts. It is a beautiful creation that continues Kygo's legacy of being the tropical house king."

Charts

References

2022 singles
2022 songs
RCA Records singles
Kygo songs
Dean Lewis songs
Song recordings produced by Kygo
Songs written by Kygo
Songs written by Dean Lewis